This is a list of flag bearers who have represented Angola at the Olympics.

Flag bearers carry the national flag of their country at the opening ceremony of the Olympic Games.

See also
Angola at the Olympics

References

Angola at the Olympics
Angola
Olympic